GrandSoissons Agglomération (before 2018: Communauté d’agglomération du Soissonnais) is the communauté d'agglomération, an intercommunal structure, centred on the town of Soissons. It is located in the Aisne department, in the Hauts-de-France region, northern France. Created in 1999, its seat is in Cuffies. Its area is 181.0 km2. Its population was 52,764 in 2019, of which 28,712 in Soissons proper.

Composition
The communauté d'agglomération consists of the following 27 communes:

Acy
Bagneux
Belleu
Bernoy-le-Château
Billy-sur-Aisne
Chavigny
Courmelles
Crouy
Cuffies
Cuisy-en-Almont
Juvigny
Leury
Mercin-et-Vaux
Missy-aux-Bois
Osly-Courtil
Pasly
Ploisy
Pommiers
Septmonts
Serches
Sermoise
Soissons
Vauxbuin
Vauxrezis
Venizel
Villeneuve-Saint-Germain
Vregny

References

Soissons
Soissons